Metapenaeopsis, the velvet shrimps, is a prawn genus in the family Penaeidae. It contains these species:

 Metapenaeopsis acclivis (Rathbun, 1902)
 Metapenaeopsis aegyptia Galil & Golani, 1990
 Metapenaeopsis andamanensis (Wood-Mason in Wood-Mason & Alcock, 1891)
 Metapenaeopsis angusta Crosnier, 1987
 Metapenaeopsis assimilis (De Man, 1920)
 Metapenaeopsis barbata (De Haan, 1844)
 Metapenaeopsis batei (Miers, 1884a)
 Metapenaeopsis beebei (Burkenroad, 1938)
 Metapenaeopsis ceylonica Starobogatov, 1972
 Metapenaeopsis commensalis Borradaile, 1899
 Metapenaeopsis coniger (Wood-Mason in Wood-Mason & Alcock, 189a)
 Metapenaeopsis costata Crosnier, 1991
 Metapenaeopsis crassissima Racek & Dall, 1965
 Metapenaeopsis dalei (Rathbun, 1902)
 Metapenaeopsis difficilis Crosnier, 1991
 Metapenaeopsis distincta (De Man, 1907)
 Metapenaeopsis dura Kubo, 1949
 Metapenaeopsis aegyptia Galil & Golani, 1990  
 Metapenaeopsis erythraea Crosnier, 1987
 Metapenaeopsis evermanni (Rathbun, 1906)
 Metapenaeopsis faouzii (Ramadan, 1938)
 Metapenaeopsis fusca Manning, R.J.G., 1988
 Metapenaeopsis gaillardi Crosnier, 1991
 Metapenaeopsis gallensis (Pearson, 1905)
 Metapenaeopsis gerardoi Pérez Farfante, 1971
 Metapenaeopsis goodei (Smith, 1885b)
 Metapenaeopsis hilarula (De Man, 1911)
 Metapenaeopsis hobbsi Pérez Farfante, 1971
 Metapenaeopsis incisa Crosnier, 1991
 Metapenaeopsis ivanovi Crosnier, 1994
 Metapenaeopsis kishinouyei (Rathbun, 1902)
 Metapenaeopsis kuboi Ivanov & Hassan, 1976
 Metapenaeopsis kyushuensis (Yokoya, 1933)
 Metapenaeopsis lamellata (De Haan, 1844)
 Metapenaeopsis lata Kubo, 1949
 Metapenaeopsis laubieri Crosnier, 1991
 Metapenaeopsis lindae R. J. G. Manning, 1988
 Metapenaeopsis liui Crosnier, 1987
 Metapenaeopsis mannarensis De Bruin, 1965
 Metapenaeopsis manningi Crosnier, 1994
 Metapenaeopsis marquesas Crosnier, 1991
 Metapenaeopsis martinella Pérez Farfante, 1971
 Metapenaeopsis menoui Crosnier, 1991
 Metapenaeopsis miersi (Holthuis, 1952)
 Metapenaeopsis mineri Burkenroad, 1934
 Metapenaeopsis mogiensis Rathbun, 1902
 Metapenaeopsis novaeguineae (Haswell, 1879)
 Metapenaeopsis palmensis (Haswell, 1879)
 Metapenaeopsis parahilarula Crosnier, 1991
 Metapenaeopsis parapalmensis Crosnier, 1994
 Metapenaeopsis perlarum Nobili, 1905
 Metapenaeopsis persica Crosnier, 1991
 Metapenaeopsis philippii (Bate, 1881)
 Metapenaeopsis propinqua Crosnier, 1991
 Metapenaeopsis provocatoria Racek & Dall, 1965
 Metapenaeopsis proxima Crosnier, 1991
 Metapenaeopsis quadrilobata Crosnier, 1991
 Metapenaeopsis quinquedentata (De Man, 1907)
 Metapenaeopsis richeri Crosnier, 1991
 Metapenaeopsis rosea Racek & Dall, 1965
 Metapenaeopsis scotti Champion, 1973
 Metapenaeopsis sibogae (De Man, 1907)
 Metapenaeopsis sinica Liu & Zhong in R. Liu & Zhong, 1983
 Metapenaeopsis sinuosa Dall, 1957
 Metapenaeopsis smithi (Schmitt, 1924)
 Metapenaeopsis spatulata Crosnier, 1991
 Metapenaeopsis spiridonovi Crosnier, 1991
 Metapenaeopsis stokmani Burukovsky, 1990
 Metapenaeopsis stridulans (Alcock, 1905)
 Metapenaeopsis tarawensis Racek & Dall, 1965
 Metapenaeopsis tchekunovae Starobogatov, 1972
 Metapenaeopsis tenella Liu & Zhong in R. Liu & Zhong, 1983
 Metapenaeopsis toloensis Hall, 1962
 Metapenaeopsis vaillanti (Nobili, 1904)
 Metapenaeopsis velutina (Dana, 1852)
 Metapenaeopsis wellsi Racek, 1967

References

Penaeidae
Taxa named by Eugène Louis Bouvier